The Trabzon Museum, also known as Kostaki Mansion (Kostaki Konağı), is a historic house museum with archeological and ethnographic exhibitions located in Trabzon, Turkey.

History 
The mansion was built in the beginning of the 1900s as a private residence for Kostaki Teophylaktos, a notable banker of Greek origin. It is known that the architect was of Italian origin and many materials used in the building were brought from Italy. However, the name of the architect is unknown.

As Teophylaktos went bankrupt in 1917, all his properties were confiscated, among them his mansion. The building was acquired by the Nemlioğlu family.

During the timespan of Turkish War of Independence (1919–1923), the mansion was used as the headquarters for the military in the region. In 1924, it was prepared for the first visit of Mustafa Kemal, the founder of the Turkish Republic, to Trabzon. Between September 15–17, he and the First Lady Latife stayed in the mansion.

In 1927, the building was nationalized by the Governor of Trabzon Ali Galip Bey, and served until 1931 as the Governor's House. Between 1931 and 1937, it was used as the inspector's office.

The Kostaki Mansion was assigned in 1937 to the Ministry of National Education, and was used for fifty years long as a vocational high school for girls. Finally, in 1987, the building was handed over to the Ministry of Culture and Tourism to be transformed into a museum.

Museum 
The building, one of the outstanding examples of the civil architecture in Turkey, was restored between 1988 and 2001. On April 22, 2001, it was opened to public as the Trabzon Museum. A total of 3,651 items are found in the museum's inventory.
 
The building is on three levels in addition to a basement. The basement comprises archeological works, while the first floor is the section for ethnographic collections. On the ground floor, items belonging to the architecture and history of the mansion are exhibited. The attic is reserved for the administration.

Archeological section 
In this section, old coins and a wide range of items are exhibited, among them of marble, basalt, ceramic, metal and glas from Bronze Age (3300–1200 BCE), Classic period (480–323 BC), Hellenistic (323-146 BC), Roman and Byzantine periods.

About the Mansion 
The ground floor is prepared to show the architecture of the building and history of the mansion in chronological order. The walls of all the rooms are decorated with near Baroque style hand carved ornamental works.

Ethnographic section 
In this section, items are on display that are characteristic for the region. Also exhibited are Islamic works and items from the Ottoman period (1299-1923).

Gallery

See also
 World Trade Center Trabzon
 Trabzon Province
 Trabzon

References 

Historic house museums in Turkey
Museums established in 2001
Archaeological museums in Turkey
Ethnographic museums in Turkey
Buildings and structures in Trabzon
2001 establishments in Turkey
Museums in Trabzon Province